Harrison George was a senior Communist Party of the United States (CPUSA) leader. He is best remembered as the editor of the official organ of the Profintern's Pan-Pacific Trade Union Secretariat (PPTUS) as well as the party's West Coast newspaper, People's World.

Career

The Pan-Pacific Trade Union Secretariat (PPTUS) was established by the Red International of Labor Unions (Profintern) in 1927, with Earl Browder as its General Secretary. Documents from the Comintern Archive in Moscow reveal the relationship between Browder and George, who at the time was an Industrial Workers of the World leader and Communist mole in the Wobblies. The minutes of a PPTUS meeting were signed by George and Tsutomu Yano, who would later recruit people for the Richard Sorge spy ring in Japan.

Intercepted Soviet intelligence traffic is alleged to reveal a covert relationship George had as a cutout transmitting information from James Walter Miller, who worked in the U.S. Post Office's Office of Censorship to the San Francisco KGB.

Harrison's role receives mention in the memoir of Whittaker Chambers:  The "Old Man" {Isaac Folkoff} is a California businessman and lifelong Communist of Russian birth, very active in party affairs on the West Coast . At the time I met him, he was also connected with my old comrade from the Daily Worker, Harrison George, who was then heading the West Coast office of the Pan-Pacific Trade Union Secretariat, an international Communist organization, which among other activities, was running couriers on the ships to Australia, Japan and Asiatic mainland ports.

Personal life
George was Earl Browder's brother-in-law.

Works 

 "The Mesaba Iron Range," International Socialist Review, vol. 17, no. 6 (December 1916), pp. 329–332.
 "Victory on the Mesaba Range," International Socialist Review, vol. 17, no. 7 (January 1917), pp. 429–431.
 "Hitting the Trail in the Lumber Camps," International Socialist Review, vol. 17, no. 8 (February 1917), pp. 455–457.

References

Further reading 

 Harvey Klehr, John Earl Haynes, and Fridrikh Igorevich Firsov, The Secret World of American Communism. New Haven: Yale University Press, 1995.

Industrial Workers of the World members
American spies for the Soviet Union
Year of birth missing
Year of death missing